Jo Matumoto (born February 5, 1971) is a Brazilian former professional baseball player. He is a left-handed pitcher.

Matumoto was born in Brazil and is of Japanese descent. He emerged from relative baseball obscurity, signed by the Toronto Blue Jays in 2007 as an undrafted free agent at the age of 36. Matumoto's wife had contacted agent Randy Hendricks as she desperately searched for someone in North America to give Matumoto an opportunity. Matumoto did not speak any English at that time. He became a free agent at the end of the  season.

While playing baseball in Japan, Matumoto was part of an "industrial league" team in Japanese professional baseball, essentially the Japanese equivalent of the Minor League Baseball circuit. He was signed by the Nippon Blue Jays—a team unaffiliated with the Toronto Blue Jays, but founded by a former Toronto Blue Jays farm team player, fellow Brazilian Jose Pett. Matumoto would play in Japan from 1996 until 2001.

Matumoto returned to Brazil and has seen action playing for their national baseball team since  and was named the Most Valuable Player (MVP) in the  South American Games when he led Brazil to a victory over Venezuela. He was considered the ace of the national team. Matumoto pitches with a three-quarters delivery, throwing in the high 80s with a solid slider. His best pitch was a screwball.

References

External links

1971 births
Living people
Brazilian expatriate baseball players in Canada
Brazilian expatriate baseball players in Japan
Brazilian expatriate baseball players in the United States
Brazilian people of Japanese descent
Chico Outlaws players
Québec Capitales players
New Hampshire Fisher Cats players
Sportspeople from São Paulo
Syracuse Chiefs players
Baseball players at the 1995 Pan American Games
Baseball players at the 1999 Pan American Games
Baseball players at the 2003 Pan American Games
Pan American Games competitors for Brazil